Pinobanksin is an antioxidant bioflavonoid (specifically a flavanonol, a category of flavonol) that inhibits peroxidation of low density lipoprotein and it has electron donor properties reducing alpha-tocopherol radicals. It is present in sunflower honey.

Pinobanksin is biosynthesized from pinocembrin.

References

External links

Flavanonols
Flavonoid antioxidants
Honey